The Quran enumerates little about the early life of the Islamic prophet Muhammad or other biographic details, but it talks about his prophetic mission, his moral excellence, and theological issues regarding him. According to the Quran, Muhammad is the last in a chain of prophets sent by Allah.

The name "Muhammad" is mentioned four times in the Quran, and the name "Ahmad" (another variant of the name of Muhammad) is mentioned one time. However, Muhammad is also referred to with various titles such as the Messenger of Allah, Prophet, unlettered, etc., and many verses about Muhammad refer directly or indirectly to him. Also, Surah (chapter) 47 of the Quran is called "Muhammad".

Mentions of name, titles, qualities

Mentions of Muhammad or Ahmad

Other titles and qualities
Other terms are used, including "Warner", "bearer of glad tidings", and the "one who invites people to a Single God" (and ), "Seal of the Prophets" (Khatam an-Nabiyyin)  i.e. there will be no more prophets after him), a "Summoner unto Allah" and "a Lamp that gives bright light" 

Verse  -- "And you did not recite before it any scripture, nor did you inscribe one with your right hand. Otherwise the falsifiers would have had [cause for] doubt"—is thought to indicate that Muhammad was illiterate and had not read any earlier scriptures.

The Quran disclaims any superhuman characteristics for Muhammad but describes him as a man possessing the highest moral excellence (Quran  "And thou dost, surely, possess sublime moral excellences"). God made him a good example or a "goodly model" for Muslims to follow (and ), full of sympathy for Muslims ("Grievous to him is what you suffer; [he is] concerned over you and to the believers is kind and merciful" ). 
In Islamic tradition, Muhammad's relation to humanity is as a bringer of truth (God's message to humanity), and as a blessing (and ) whose message will give people salvation in the afterlife. It is believed by at least one pious commentator that it is Muhammad's teachings and the purity of his personal life alone that keep alive the worship of God.

Involvement in doctrine, mission, life
While the Quran does not tell the story of the Prophet's life, a number of verses of the Quran concerning Muhammad affect Islamic doctrine, or refer to Muhammad's mission or personal life.

Quran
Some verses in the Quran concern a particular role of Muhammad (that is; being the spreader of ‘the message’). These include: 
 "If you should love Allah, then follow me [i.e. Muhammad], ... Say, 'Obey Allah and the Messenger.'"
 "O ye who believe! Obey Allah, and obey the Messenger, and those charged with authority among you...." (known as the Obedience Verse) 
 "And whoever obeys Allah and the Messenger - those will be with the ones upon whom Allah has bestowed favor of the prophets ..."
 "Say: Obey Allah and obey the Messenger, ... If you obey him, you shall be on the right guidance"
 "In God's messenger you have indeed a good example for everyone who looks forward with hope to God and the Last Day ..."

These verses say to obey the messenger only, referring to the role of the spread of the message. The message in particular is in reference to the Quran itself, in which lies the message of God within the complied verses. The key term 'messenger' is important because the titles used refer to specifically different roles of Muhammad. When 'Muhammad' is used, it is only in reference to his life and not his prophet hood. Whereas with the use of Nabi, it refers to his role and status as prophet only. This is why it's crucial to acknowledge the difference between these different titles, since 'messenger' in these verses refer only to the spreading of the Quran.

Muhammad's mission
Many important events and turning points in the mission of The Prophet were connected with revelations from the Quran, although the verses are not necessarily addressed to Muhammad. (Like many verses in the Quran, they often refer to an event/story/moral  without  explaining the dispute/issue involved. These are made clear by Quranic commentary, by prophetic biography and/or by hadith.) 
Holy months
After migrating to Medina, the Muslims began raiding Meccan caravans. In their first successful raid, the caravan's merchandise was captured, one caravan guard killed and two captured and later ransomed. However, the raid happened when warfare was banned, i.e. during one of the Arab "sacred months" (the 1st, 7th, 11th and 12th months of the Arab calendar). While his followers were reportedly dismayed at this violation of tradition, Muhammad received a revelation reassuring them raids against unbelievers by Muslims during the four months  were now permitted by God.
 "They ask you about the sacred month - about fighting therein. Say, "Fighting therein is great [sin], but averting [people] from the way of Allah and disbelief in Him and [preventing access to] al-Masjid al-Haram and the expulsion of its people therefrom are greater [evil] in the sight of Allah. And fitnah is greater than killing."

Battle of Badr
The first battle the Muslims fought against their unbeliever enemies at Badr in 624 CE was a victory where Muslims killed several important Meccan leaders. The battle is mentioned in the Quran as an example of how God helped Muslims and who should show gratitude in return.
 "And already had Allah given you victory at [the battle of] Badr while you were few in number. Then fear Allah ; perhaps you will be grateful." A verse (apparently addressed to Muhammad) also talks about 3000 angels that helped the believers in battle.
 "[Remember] when you said to the believers, 'Is it not sufficient for you that your Lord should reinforce you with three thousand angels sent down?'"
Battle of Uhud
A year later Muslims suffered a setback against a superior force of Meccans at the Battle of Uhud when several dozen Muslims were killed and Muhammad was  wounded.
A verse revealed soon after explained why if Muslims had God's favor they had not won the battle as they had at Badr: they disobeyed the Prophets orders and were hasty in collecting loot before the battle was won.
 "And Allah had certainly fulfilled His promise to you when you were killing the enemy by His permission until [the time] when you lost courage and fell to disputing about the order [given by the Prophet] and disobeyed after He had shown you that which you love." 
Battle of the Trench
Verses   recalls the doubts and fears of some of inhabitants of Medina in the pivotal Battle of the Trench where Muhammad led the Muslims in digging a protective trench  and overcame a siege by 10,000 Meccan unbelievers.  (Some had lost faith and abandoned the city.) In response to his followers abandoning of work on the trench without Muhammad's permission (prior to the battle), a verse was revealed telling them not to: 
 "Only those are believers, who believe in God and His Messenger. when they are with him on a matter requiring collective action, they do not depart until they have asked for his leave ..." 
Jizyah
After the Quraish tribe was vanquished and Makka conquered, the Muslims' position under Muhammad was much stronger and (according to Western scholar Alfred Guillaume), the Islamic position towards Arab Christians who had not yet converted to Islam was "modified". A verse was revealed requiring Christians ( and Jews) to pay a special tax (jizyah) and be "humbled".  
 "Fight those who do not believe in Allah or in the Last Day and who do not consider unlawful what Allah and His Messenger have made unlawful and who do not adopt the religion of truth from those who were given the Scripture - [fight] until they give the jizyah willingly while they are humbled."

Involvement in Muhammad's personal life
While the Quran's message is eternal and universal, a number of Quranic verses refer to specific issues in the life of the Prophet.

Some verses pertaining to the Prophet's marital relations, these include 
 which gave Muhammad the right to marry daughters of his aunts and uncles "a privilege for you only, not for the (rest of) the believers" (who were limited to four wives). Most of the prophet's marriages were for geopolitical reasons or to correct social taboos (e.g. remarriage of widows etc.)
 gave Muhammad the right to "... postpone (the turn in bed of) whom you will of them (your wives), and you may receive whom you will ..." telling his wives they "should be content and not grieve and that they should be satisfied with what you have given them."  The prophet was told that he need not observe a strict rotation, although he himself, impelled by an inborn sense of fairness, always endeavored to give them a feeling of absolute equality. 
After Muhammad married Zaynab bint Jahsh, the ex-wife of his adopted son Zayd ibn Harithah, who had divorced her because they did not get along, causing some consternation in the community, verse  was revealed, saying in part "...We gave her [Zaynab bint Jahsh] to you in marriage, so that (in future) there may be no difficulty to the believers in respect of (the marriage of) the wives of their adopted sons..." Mohammad has endeavored to save the marriage since it was made on the basis of a slave being equal to a free man. 
During a dispute with his wives where Muhammad boycotted his wives for a month, the following verses were revealed: "O Prophet! Why do you ban (for yourself) that which God has made lawful to you", and chastising two wives (Aisha and Hafsa bint Umar) for betraying a confidence. However the majority of Muslim scholars regard a different Asbāb al-nuzūl (circumstance of revelation) for Surah 66:1-5, namely the "honey-incident": 

 includes several regulations for his followers such as entering any of Muhammad's houses "except when you are permitted for a meal, without awaiting its readiness", attempting "to remain for conversation" after the meal, talking to any of his wives except behind a partition, or remarrying any of them "after him, ever. Indeed, that would be in the sight of Allah an enormity." The prophet's wives are referred to as Mother of the Believers and were given the choice of forsaking him for the life of this world and its charms (Quran 33: 29).

While some have criticized these revelations as "convenient", encouraging Muhammad's "personal indulgences" and suggesting that the verses may actually have been concocted by Muhammad and not revealed by God, Muslims have pointed out various reasons for their wisdom. At that time, it was a common practice for men to have slave concubines and was not considered adultery; "Why must he (or anyone else, for that matter) prohibit something for themselves when God has not prohibited it for them?" The Prophet had special obligations, such as praying at night (Tahajjud), as well as privileges. The wives of the prophet were forbidden from remarrying because they were considered to be the "mothers of the believers".

See also 
 Ahmad the Paraclete
 Mahammaddim in the Song of Solomon
 Muhammad and the Bible
 Verse of Ikmal al-Din
 Verse of Loan
 Verse of Wilayah
 Warning Verse
 Verse of Brotherhood
 Verse of Purification
 People of the Ditch
 The verse of evil eye
 Obedience Verse
 Verse of Mawadda
 Ali in the Quran
 List of characters and names mentioned in the Quran

References 

Quran
Quran